Pedro Fonseca (born 20 May 1997) is a Brazilian footballer who plays as a forward for South Georgia Tormenta in the USL League One.

Career

Youth 
Fonseca was born in Rio de Janeiro, and spent time with the academy side at Fluminense, before spending spells on loan in Spain with Espanyol and later with Portuguese side Marítimo in 2016. Fonseca then made the decision to move to the United States, whilst also studying in Brazil, with the plan to play college soccer when he graduated. Whilst in the United States, Fonseca joined FC Golden State, appearing for the team in the USL PDL, helping them win the Western Conference title in 2017 and playing in the Lamar Hunt U.S. Open Cup against LA Galaxy in 2018.

College 
In 2018, Fonseca committed to playing college soccer at the University of Louisville. In four seasons with the Cardinals, Fonseca went on to make 48 appearances, scoring 15 goals and adding 16 assists. He was named All-ACC First Team and United Soccer Coaches All-South Region Second Team in 2021, and All-ACC Second Team in 2020.

While at college, Fonseca continued to appear for FC Golden State Force in both the USL League Two, formerly USL PDL, and the National Premier Soccer League.

Professional 
On 11 January 2022, Fonseca was selected 53rd overall in the 2022 MLS SuperDraft by Real Salt Lake. On 9 February 2022, Fonseca signed with Salt Lake's MLS Next Pro side Real Monarchs. During the 2022 season, Fonseca went on to make 20 appearances for the Monarchs, scoring seven goals and tallying four assists, earning him the Most Valuable Player award for the club at the end of the year.

On 26 January 2023, Fonseca signed with USL League One side South Georgia Tormenta on a two-year deal.

References

1997 births
Living people
Association football forwards
Brazilian footballers
Brazilian expatriate footballers
Brazilian expatriate sportspeople in Portugal
Brazilian expatriate sportspeople in Spain
Brazilian expatriate sportspeople in the United States
C.S. Marítimo players
Expatriate soccer players in the United States
FC Golden State Force players
Fluminense FC players
Louisville Cardinals men's soccer players
MLS Next Pro players
National Premier Soccer League players
RCD Espanyol footballers
Real Salt Lake draft picks
Real Monarchs players
Tormenta FC players
USL League Two players